The Greek Motorway 5 (code: A5) is a motorway in Greece. The motorway, commonly referred to as Ionia Odos or Ionia Motorway, starts at Ioannina and it follows the western coastline of mainland Greece down to the Gulf of Corinth. At Rio, it crosses the gulf via the Rio–Antirrio bridge and is connected with the A8 Motorway at an interchange near Patras. The future, currently under construction, Patras - Pyrgos motorway is typically part of the A5 Motorway.

In August 2017, the last section under construction (Perdika-Ioannina) was completed and delivered to traffic by the Greek Minister of Infrastructure, Transport and Network, making Ionia Odos a fully operational motorway. It is the second major north–south road connection after Motorway 1 and is also part of the trans-balkanic Adriatic–Ionian motorway and the European routes E55 and E951.

The Ionia Odos motorway was one of the most challenging construction projects in Greece, as it spans a big part of Western Greece and because of its location on the foothills of the Pindus mountain range. After its completion in August 2017, it reduced travel times between Antirrio and Ioannina to 1 hour and 40 minutes, down from 3 hours and 30 minutes and will provide a boost to the economy of the regions it spans (Western Greece and Epirus).

Ionia Odos

Brief presentation
The motorway consists of:
196 kilometres of motorway, with 2 lanes in each direction, emergency lane and Jersey barrier separation
19 interchanges
133 overpasses and underpasses
4 twin-tube tunnels
24 bridges
4 main and 5 lateral toll stations
5 rest areas (4 in both directions)

Rio–Antirrio bridge
Construction of the Rio–Antirrio bridge, the world's longest fully suspended cable-stayed bridge, began in 1998, more than 100 years after a first proposal by then-prime minister Charilaos Trikoupis. The bridge was inaugurated on 7 August 2004, a week before the opening of the 2004 Summer Olympics in Athens.

Agrinio and Arta bypasses
With a length of 33 km, the Agrinio bypass was the first major segment of the northern A5 section to be completed. While construction had begun in 2002/03, it was fully put into service in May 2009. Starting from Aitoliko, the road bypasses the largest city and economical center of the Aetolia-Acarnania prefecture, Agrinio and ends in Kouvaras. It largely replaced the 12 km longer National Road 5. On July 28, 2015, a 4,5 km segment before the Aitoliko interchange became operational. This segment features the Ioannina-Antirrio carriageway, with the Antirrio-Ioannina carriageway being under construction where the old road was. The latter was moved eastwards in order to make room for the construction of the motorway and the traffic is diverted there.

The 17 km Arta bypass begins from Sellades near Arta and ends at Filippiada, near the border with the prefecture of Preveza. Its first part (Arta north interchange - Filippiada was opened in 2003 and the second part (Sellades/Arta south interchange - Arta north interchange) was opened in April 2011, with the bridge of the Arta north interchange being inaugurated on 22 November 2013.

Rest of the motorway - construction progress
As of December 2016, the 25 km Kouvaras interchange - Amfilochia interchange (Amfilochia bypass) segment has been completed. It should have been opened by July 2016, but because of landslides just before the Amfilochia interchange, it was opened on 27 December 2016 by the minister Christos Spirtzis.  Also, the 37 km long section Kampi (Filippiada interchange) - Avgo was opened to traffic on 22 February 2017 by the minister of infrastructure Christos Spirtzis, however without the connection with the Egnatia Odos, which was completed in August 2017. The latter was one of the most difficult motorway segments under construction in Greece because of the rugged mountainous terrain along its route. The most important tunnel of the motorway, the Klokova Tunnel, has been excavated and other works are undergoing. The 37 km section Klokova-Kefalovryso was opened to traffic on 12 April 2017 (without some of the interchanges, which are ready by August 2017). In early September 2016, It was announced that the rest of the expropriation works were successfully settled with the house owners receiving compensations for their respective areas, thus allowing  full construction of the road.

Nea Odos consortium
In late 2006, construction and maintenance of the motorway's northern, Ionia Odos, section from Ioannina to the Rio intersection has been granted to the Greek-Spanish "Nea Odos" consortium, which is also responsible for the maintenance of the Athens–Skarfeia (near Lamia) section of the A1 Motorway. The consortium, consisting of construction firms GEK Group of Companies SA, Terna SA, Cintra SA, and Grupo ACS, will build and operate the road, receiving toll fees for 30 years, while investing a combined €1.15 billion in the project. The rest of the total €1.4 billion funds will be provided by the European Union and the Greek government. Construction, undertaken by the Euroionia Joint Venture (Terna SA, Dragados SA and Ferrovial SA) finally started in 2008 with a completion date of 72 months.  The bill was ratified on March 28, 2007.

In 2010, it was expected that the full length of the motorway would be completed by the end of 2013. However, the consortium's economical problems led to the construction being stopped in 2011. Construction works have been resumed by April 2013, but the slow progress of expropriations, archaeological investigations, expropriation-related lawsuits and environmental issues led to further significant delays. Currently, the remaining parts are expected to be finished by March 2017.

Exit list

The exits of the main northern section of the A5 motorway:

Patras bypass 
The Patras bypass was the first segment of Olympia Odos that was put into service. Planning of the bypass began in the 1980s, but construction did not begin until the 1990s. It passes east of the city, through the foothills of the Panachaiko mountain, and consists of several tunnels and bridges. In October 2002, the bypass was opened to traffic. As a result, traffic in downtown Patras has significantly decreased.

Largely following the course of National Road 9, the Patras bypass in early years was signposted as part of a new, separate Motorway 9. Later it was reassigned to the then-planned trans-Peloponnese Motorway 8, before it was considered a part of the Adriatic–Ionian Motorway 5.

Olympia Odos consortium
Construction and maintenance of the Patras bypass Olympia Odos section has been mandated to the "Olympia Odos" consortium which also built the A8 Motorway.

Exit list
=

The exits of the southern, Patras bypass, section of the A5 motorway:

See also
 Highways in Greece

References

Motorways in Greece
Toll roads in Greece
Roads in Epirus (region)
Roads in Western Greece
Roads in Peloponnese (region)